Kunal Vijaykar (born 19 May 1964) is a broadcaster, food writer, author, actor and television personality.
A whole generation have watched him eat his way into the hearts of hundreds and thousands of Indians.  He is India’s most recognisable food show host, and the anchor of the country's most popular food show The Foodie – with Kunal Vijayakar, a show which ran uninterrupted for nine years, completing close to 500 episodes. He has been a food columnist and writer with The Times of India, Bombay Times, DNA, Asian Age, Mahanagar, and The Week and is currently a food writer and columnist with Hindustan Times. He is the author of Made In India – his first cookbook. He also operates his own YouTube channel by the name of "Khaane mein kya hai" (loosely translates to "What's for lunch?"), which has around 234k subscribers currently. He is also an actor, director and political satirist, and writer, performer and director of the political satirical show The News That Wasn't and The Week That Wasn't on CNN News18, along with regular collaborator and close friend Cyrus Broacha.

Early life
He studied at St. Mary's School, Mumbai. He then received his bachelor's degree from Sir J.J. Institute of Applied Art, Mumbai.

Career
Kunal started out by appearing in various TV commercials and appeared in supporting roles in many Hindi movies, including Duplicate (1998) by Mahesh Bhatt, Paisa Vasool (2004), and Salaam Namaste (2005) with Saif Ali Khan and Preity Zinta.

He played the role of a journalist in the Hindi film Ghajini (2008) and was seen as Kunal in Little Zizou (2009), a story of the Parsi community.

He is the host of the channel Times Now show titled The Foodie, which features him travelling around the country sampling exotic foods. His weekly satire comedy show The Week That Wasn't, with comedian Cyrus Broacha on CNN IBN completed eight years and 450 episodes in 2015. He does a sketch show with Cyrus Broacha, Cyrusitis, written and directed by Broacha.

Vijaykar debuted as a screenwriter and director in 2009 with Fruit and Nut, a comedy starring Dia Mirza, Cyrus Broacha, Boman Irani, and Mahesh Manjrekar.

Since 2011, he also writes the fortnightly humour column "Funda Mental", in The Week magazine.

Has just written his first cookbook Made in India, published by Jaico.

Filmography

Actor
 Duplicate (1998)
 Bollywood Calling (2001)
 Main Prem Ki Diwani Hoon (2003)
 Paisa Vasool (2004)
 Ab Tak Chhappan (2004)
 Jo Bole So Nihaal (2005)
 Salaam Namaste (2005))
 Ghajini (2008)
 Little Zizou (2009)
 Fruit and Nut (2009)
Guilty (2020)
 Hello Charlie (2021)

Director
 Fruit And Nut (2009)

References

External links
 

Living people
Indian male television actors
Male actors in Hindi cinema
Hindi-language film directors
Indian male comedians
Male actors from Mumbai
Place of birth missing (living people)
1964 births